Totuya is a village in Suzak District, Jalal-Abad Region, Kyrgyzstan. Its population was 3,302 in 2021.

References

Populated places in Jalal-Abad Region